Apaki is a village in western Benin near the Togolese border. It is located in Savalou commune in the Collines Department.

Nearby towns and villages include Agbanho (1.0 nm), Kotongbo (1.4 nm), Lekpa (2.0 nm), Alekpo (3.6 nm), Pepelou (3.6 nm), Ekpa (1.0 nm) and Takete (1.4 nm). 
.

References

Populated places in Benin